Feeney Col is a col at the northeast side of Feeney Peak, near the center of the Medina Peaks in the Queen Maud Mountains of Antarctica. It was mapped by the United States Geological Survey from surveys and U.S. Navy air photos, 1960–64. The col was used by members of New Zealand Geological Survey Antarctic Expedition, 1969–70, who named it in association with Feeney Peak.

References 

Mountain passes of the Ross Dependency
Amundsen Coast